Sar Mastan (also Romanized as Sar Mastān; also known as Sarvestān and Sarvistān) is a village in Sar Mastan Rural District of Abdan District of Deyr County, Bushehr province, Iran. At the 2006 census, its population was 523 in 93 households, when it was in Abdan Rural District of the Central District. The following census in 2011 counted 576 people in 126 households. The latest census in 2016 showed a population of 468 people in 127 households, by which time it was in Sar Mastan Rural District of the newly created Abdan District; it was the largest village in its rural district.

References 

Populated places in Deyr County